Arthur J. "Dutch" Bergman (February 23, 1895 – August 18, 1972) was an American football player and coach. He served as the head football coach at the New Mexico College of Agriculture and Mechanic Arts, now New Mexico State University, from 1920 to 1922 and at The Catholic University of America from 1930 to 1940, compiling a career college football record of 71–36–5. Bergman was the head coach of the National Football League's Washington Redskins for one season in 1943, tallying a mark of 6–3–1.

During his tenure, the Cardinals went 59–31–4, including a victory in the 1936 Orange Bowl and a tie in the 1940 Sun Bowl. Bergman left the University when the sport was discontinued in 1941 because of World War II, later coaching the Washington Redskins to the 1943 NFL Championship Game, which they lost to the Chicago Bears.

Bergman is still the winningest varsity football coach in Catholic University history and was inducted into their Hall of Fame in 1982.

Head coaching record

College football

References

External links
 

1895 births
1972 deaths
American football halfbacks
Basketball coaches from Indiana
Catholic University Cardinals athletic directors
Catholic University Cardinals football coaches
Dayton Flyers football coaches
New Mexico State Aggies athletic directors
New Mexico State Aggies football coaches
New Mexico State Aggies men's basketball coaches
Notre Dame Fighting Irish football players
Minnesota Golden Gophers baseball coaches
Minnesota Golden Gophers football coaches
Washington Redskins head coaches
People from Peru, Indiana
Players of American football from Indiana
Notre Dame Fighting Irish men's track and field athletes